Liu Yang (born 10 September 1994) is a Chinese artistic gymnast. He is the 2020 Olympic and 2014 World champion on rings. He was a member of the Chinese team who won gold at the 2014 World Championships and also won bronze in the team competition at the 2016 Olympics.

Career 
Liu began gymnastics when he was five years old.

At the 2013 Cottbus World Cup, Liu won the silver medal on the rings behind Greek gymnast Eleftherios Petrounias. He finished fourth in the rings final at the 2013 World Championships.

At the 2014 World Championships, Liu competed alongside Cheng Ran, Deng Shudi, Lin Chaopan, You Hao, and Zhang Chenglong, and they won the gold medal in the team event. Individually, he won the gold medal on rings. He said on winning the rings gold medal, "I am very, very excited that I won the gold medal today and I wish to thank my teammates and my brothers and my sisters who have been cheering for me along the way... Last year during the World Championships I came fourth because of some minor mistakes I made during my performance. But this year I seized the opportunity and I managed to win and I am still very excited right now."

Liu competed at the 2015 World Championships and won the bronze medal with the Chinese team. In the rings final, he won the bronze medal behind Eleftherios Petrounias and You Hao.

Liu was selected to represent China at the 2016 Summer Olympics alongside Deng Shudi, Lin Chaopan, Zhang Chenglong, and You Han. They won the bronze medal in the team competition behind Japan and Russia. In the rings event final, he finished fourth.

At the 2017 World Championships, Liu won the bronze medal on rings behind Eleftherios Petrounias and Denis Ablyazin.

Liu began his attempt to qualify for the 2020 Olympics through the World Cup series at the 2018 Cottbus World Cup where he won the gold medal on rings. He also won the gold medal on rings at the 2019 Melbourne World Cup and the 2019 Cottbus World Cup. While Liu won the maximum number of points through the World Cup series, he lost the tiebreaker to Eleftherios Petrounias and did not earn the Olympic spot.

China earned an additional quota for the 2020 Olympics through the cancelled All-Around World Cup series, and this spot was awarded to Liu. At the 2020 Olympics, Liu won the gold medal on the rings with a score of 15.500 with teammate You Hao winning the silver medal.

References

External links 
 

1994 births
Living people
Medalists at the World Artistic Gymnastics Championships
Chinese male artistic gymnasts
World champion gymnasts
Olympic gymnasts of China
Olympic medalists in gymnastics
Gymnasts at the 2016 Summer Olympics
2016 Olympic bronze medalists for China
People from Anshan
Gymnasts from Liaoning
Gymnasts at the 2020 Summer Olympics
Medalists at the 2020 Summer Olympics
Olympic gold medalists for China
21st-century Chinese people